John, Prince of Portugal (29 January – February 1451) was a Portuguese infante, son of Afonso V and Isabella of Coimbra. He was born heir to the throne in 1451, but he died young during the same year. The title of Prince of Portugal then passed again to Infante Ferdinand, Duke of Viseu, his uncle.

House of Aviz
Heirs apparent who never acceded
Princes of Portugal
Portuguese infantes
1451 births
1450s deaths
People from Sintra
15th-century Portuguese people
Sons of kings
Royalty and nobility who died as children